The NSB Type 12a, NSB Type 12b and NSB Type 12c were three steam locomotives built between 1891 and 1898 by Sächsische Maschinenfabrik and Dübs and Company for use on various railway lines in Norway. They were tank engines, which were useful so they wouldn't have to be turned around.

History 
The Norwegian railway lines, which were owned by the state, were administratively separate entities at the time. Locomotives were therefore permanently assigned to routes. It was not until July 1, 1920, that the Type 12 series steam locomotives, intended primarily for hauling local passenger trains, were officially assigned to the Oslo District.

NSB Type 12a 
12a no. 67 (Dübs 2846) was built for local trains between Kristiania and Ljan on the Smaalensbane (SB). The locomotive was ordered on November 18, 1890. After delivery in October 1891, she was put in service in November. It was fitted with a Bissel bogie at the front and an Adams axle at the rear, and was a high-pressure, saturated steam locomotive.

This was the same design as the NSB Type 11, which was being constructed and supplied at the same time by Dübs and Company.

The locomotive was withdrawn on March 24, 1952, and then scrapped.

NSB Type 12b/12c 
The other two locomotives—12c no. 100 and 12b no. 101—were ordered from the Sächsische Maschinenfabrik on February 23, 1897, and delivered on 1898 with factory numbers 2311 and 2311. From April 4, 1898, they were used on the Jaren–Røykenvik line belonging to the Kristiania–Gjøvikbanen (KGB) and had to run trains between Jaren and Røykenvik. Both locomotives were compound steam locomotives, unlike 12a no. 67. This locomotive type was further developed, and the successor was delivered to the Vossebane in 1904 as the Type 20.

12c no. 100 differed from 12b no. 101 slightly due to having larger water and coal capacity.

Both locomotives were put aside on October 25, 1951, Withdrawn on February 16, 1953, and then scrapped.

References

General references
 T. Bjerke, TB Hansen, EW Johansson, S. Sando. Edited by Norwegian Railway Club. Oslo / Lillehammer / Trondheim 1987, ISBN 82-90286-09-0, S. 133–134 (Norwegian).

External links 

 Type 12 – NJK Materielldatabasen (Norwegian).
 Type 12 picture - Bilde på digitaltmuseum.no (Norwegian).
 Delivery list Nydqvist & Holm AB – Bofors-Nohab AB, Trollhättan, Sverige. In: www.svenska-lok.se. (Swedish).

Steam locomotives of Norway
2-6-2T locomotives